Madalena (English: Magdalene) is a former civil parish (freguesia) in the city and municipality of Lisbon, Portugal. It has a total area of 0.11 km2 and total population of 380 inhabitants (2001); density: 3,423 inhabitants/km2. At the administrative reorganization of Lisbon on 8 December 2012 it became part of the parish Santa Maria Maior.

People 

 Manuel Luís Goucha (born 1954, television presenter)

Main sites
Praça do Comércio

References 

Former parishes of Lisbon